The Dole Air Race, also known as the Dole Derby, was a deadly air race across the Pacific Ocean from Oakland, California to Honolulu in the Territory of Hawaii held in August 1927. There were eighteen official and unofficial entrants; fifteen of those drew for starting positions, and of those fifteen, two were disqualified, two withdrew, and three aircraft crashed before the race, resulting in three deaths. Eight aircraft eventually participated in the start of the race on August 16, with only two successfully arriving in Hawaii; Woolaroc, a Travel Air 5000 piloted by Arthur C. Goebel and William V. Davis, arrived after a 26 hour, 15 minute flight, leading runner-up Aloha by two hours.

Of the unsuccessful six aircraft, two crashed on takeoff, two were forced to return for repairs, and two went missing during the race (Golden Eagle and Miss Doran). One of the aircraft that was repaired took off again to search for the missing aircraft several days later and also vanished over the sea (Dallas Spirit). In all, before, during, and after the race, ten people died and six airplanes were lost or damaged beyond repair.

The Dole prize

The flights would have to complete in the 12 months following August 15, 1927. Dole stated he hoped that Lindbergh would compete. The prospect of breaking more long-distance flight records enticed other wealthy businessmen to offer similar Pacific-conquering prizes: Sid Grauman offered  to the first to fly from Los Angeles to Tokyo, and William Easterwood offered a similar  prize for the first to fly from Dallas to Hong Kong in three stops and no more than six days. All the wealthy patrons hoped to draw Lindbergh.

The Honolulu chapter of the National Aeronautic Association drew up rules for the Dole race.

The transpacific record
The publicity for the first successful transpacific flights from Oakland to Hawaii was stolen by two flights in June and July 1927, ahead of the scheduled August start for the Dole Derby. On 28 June, about a month after Dole posted the prizes, Air Corps Lieutenants Lester J. Maitland and Albert F. Hegenberger flew a three-engine Atlantic-Fokker C-2 military aircraft from Oakland Municipal Airport to Wheeler Army Airfield on Oahu in 25 hours and 50 minutes. An earlier attempt in 1925 had ended in failure for two Navy PN-9 seaplanes; one of the aircraft, commanded by Commander John Rodgers, ran out of fuel several hundred miles short of Hawaii and sailed to Kauai over the next nine days.

Ernie Smith and Captain C.H. Carter had arrived in Oakland earlier to attempt to parallel the Maitland/Hegenberger flight in the City of Oakland, a small Travel Air 5000 civilian monoplane, but due to mechanical difficulties, took off two hours after Maitland, and returned with a broken windshield. Unlike Lindbergh's purpose-built Spirit of St. Louis, City of Oakland had been serving as a mail carrier for Pacific Air Transport. According to Smith, Carter threatened to dump the gas after the windshield was lost, forcing the plane's return shortly after takeoff. Carter quit after the record was lost, but Smith hired Emory Bronte as a navigator, and took off again on July 14. Upon running out of fuel 26 hours and 36 minutes later, they crash-landed in a thorn tree on Molokai.

Dole disqualified the successful June and July flights from his prizes because they had not followed his rules. The Air Corps flight had been planned months prior to the prize announcement and had no intent to land other than at Wheeler.

By July 22, the starting and ending points had not been set. San Francisco began developing its new municipal airport, Mills Field, in anticipation that it could entice pilots into choosing it as the origin; the initial planned destination was John Rodgers Airport near Honolulu.

Contestants draw positions 

The first official entrant, announced on June 28, was Arthur C. Goebel. Another early entrant was Dick Grace, who shipped his plane to San Francisco shortly after he crashed his Cruzair, forcing him to abandon a Kauai to San Francisco attempt in June. At the time, both Grace and Goebel were better known as founding members of the Thirteen Flying Black Cats, nicknamed the "Suicide Squadron", a Hollywood stunt pilot association started in 1922; that group's exploits were dramatized in the 1932 film The Lost Squadron. The two stuntmen were quickly joined by other contestants as the August 2 entry deadline approached.

Fourteen official and four unofficial entrants were announced on August 3; Grace was not part of the group. The draw for starting position in the Dole race was held on 8 August in the office of C. W. Saunders, California director of the National Aeronautics Association, at the Matson Building in San Francisco. Of the eighteen entries, fifteen made the official draw; contestants could choose to take off from Mills Field near San Francisco or Oakland Municipal Airport, but the contestants later decided the air currents at Mills were too dangerous and all aircraft would take off from Oakland instead.

Contestants were to present the aircraft and pilots by Monday, August 8 in San Francisco, so the Bay Area chapter of the National Aeronautic Association could check their certificates and licenses as a final qualification. Once their papers were checked, the contestants would again draw for starting positions.

Race preparations

Trouble and confidence before the race
Before the race started, many of the aircraft had mechanical issues during test flights and while traveling to San Francisco to meet the final qualification deadline. City of Peoria (Parkhurst/Lowes) was delayed by sandflies, and Bluebird (Giles) was stuck at Detroit with engine issues. 

Oklahoma (Griffin/Henley) took off on August 4 for an intended nonstop flight from Bartlesville to San Francisco, but was forced down near Amboy by a broken exhaust pipe; after effecting repairs, Oklahoma took off again at approximately 7 AM on August 5, but the aircraft came down again  outside of Los Angeles due to heavy fog. 

Spirit of John Rodgers (Covell/Waggener) was also forced down twice during a flight from Brea to San Diego: first near Santa Ana by fog during a test flight on August 5;  then again after an oil feed line broke on August 6, forcing the plane down at Escondido.

Meanwhile, Mildred Doran, Auggy Pedlar, and navigator Manley Lawing were flying into Oakland on August 6 when their aircraft developed engine trouble due to fouled spark plugs. They successfully landed near Mendota in a wheat field in the San Joaquin Valley, but damaged the landing gear in the process and had trouble making repairs because they no longer had any tools. Doran went to Modesto, California to secure tools and a mechanic; she quipped "We threw [the tools] off at Long Beach because they were in the way and cluttering things up." Lawing, chief aerographer and meteorologist at Naval Air Station North Island, was later replaced by Vilas R. Knope when Lawing could not satisfy the race committee of his navigational skills. He reportedly got lost over Oakland.

James L. Giffin announced he needed US$15,000 to complete a giant triplane under construction in July 1927; at the time, he was planning to fly it from Los Angeles to Tokyo via Hawaii. The motors of the triplane, by then named Pride of Los Angeles, were installed in early August. Giffin's intended final destination was Paris, a flight of 30 days in total via Borneo, India, Constantinople, and Rome.

Frank Clarke's biplane Miss Hollydale completed a roundtrip test flight from Los Angeles to San Diego without incident on August 4. Captain and Mrs. Erwin announced they would be departing Dallas in the Dallas Spirit for Oakland on August 6 or 7, planning to continue around the world via Tokyo after the race to Hawaii.

El Encanto means "The Enchanted" and was designed by Goddard after the streamlining of a salmon.

Woolaroc, piloted by Goebel, was originally intended to fly solo, but later decided to have Lieutenant W. J. Slattery navigate; for the flight to Hawaii, Lt. William V. Davis navigated for Woolaroc. Goebel departed from Bartlesville on a nonstop flight to San Francisco on August 6. In test flights before the race, Goebel's Woolaroc encountered gear issues that required Goebel to hang outside the plane to fix.

Martin Jensen and Robert Fowler competed over the purchase rights for the same Breese-Wilde Model 5; Jensen won that race after his wife Margaret raised US$15,000 from local backers in Honolulu, and Jensen took delivery of Aloha on August 8. Fowler, left without an airplane for the contest, was forced to withdraw. Because Aloha was only completed when the race was nearly about to begin, the preparations for the contest were rushed; the fuel tanks on Aloha only held  and the original plan was to add sufficient spare fuel capacity via forty-nine portable  containers, requiring the navigator to fill the central tank, then transfer fuel to the  tank in use via a hand pump; the plane was later retrofitted with a  tank, obviating the need for the complicated refueling plan, which would have required the passing of written messages between the two men.

Three days: three crashes, three dead

Two days after they drew the thirteenth position, on August 10 United States Navy Lieutenants George W. D. Covell and R. S. Waggener took off from San Diego, California in their Tremaine Humming Bird named Spirit of John Rodgers to fly to Oakland; after flying into a fog bank, the aircraft crashed into an ocean cliff at Point Loma, killing both men. Lt. Leo Pawlikowski was the navigator originally announced; Pawlikowski had developed an abscess on his back which required surgery, and the doctors would not allow him to participate, so he was replaced with Waggener. William Davis, a Navy lieutenant who would serve as the navigator for Art Goebel on Woolaroc, was granted leave to participate in the race; he had planned to catch a ride with Covell and Waggener to San Francisco, but the leave was not granted in time, and he took a train from San Diego instead.

Then, on 11 August, as J. L. Giffin and Theodore S. Lundgren approached Oakland, their aircraft, an International CF-10 Triplane, the Pride of Los Angeles, crashed into San Francisco Bay, but the two men and their passenger, Laurence Willes, were able to escape and swim to shore.

Leland A. Bryant, the designer of the aircraft, was to have served as Rogers's navigator, but was not on board during the test flight.

Withdrawals and disqualifications
Maj. Livingston Irving was the first pilot to qualify for the contest. During the pre-race inspections, Major Clarence Young declared that up to ten of the fifteen entries may be disqualified for inadequate fuel capacity; the rule stated that a single-engine aircraft was required to carry  of fuel, a nominal capacity of  plus a 15% reserve. Another rule was interpreted to require pilots to hold a license from the Department of Commerce, which five pilots (not named) did not have.

The race, originally scheduled to start on August 12, was postponed on August 11, in light of the numerous mechanical issues, failed qualification tests, and poor weather. The Aeronautics Division of the Commerce Department (the forerunner to today's Federal Aviation Administration) felt the planned race was unsafe and supported a two-week delay; other changes urged by the Aeronautics Division included switching the route to fly an equivalent distance over land (for instance, a nonstop flight across the continental United States) or changing the direction to fly from Hawaii to California, as the consequences of a navigation error would be less dire. Several contestants protested the delay, and the Honolulu chapter of the National Aeronautic Association refused to endorse the recommendation of the Oakland chapter to postpone, meaning the race would proceed. However, nine of the contestants agreed to postpone the contest late in the evening of August 11, which would give the teams time to rest and pass the stringent qualification tests; the deadline to qualify was extended to 10 AM on August 15.

A three-part qualification test was administered to the navigators by Naval Lieutenant Ben H. Wyatt, consisting of a written, oral, and flying examination. For the flight exam, the pilot and navigator were sent over a predetermined course and upon their return, quizzed to determine which points they had passed. By August 11, none of the crews had passed the test. Pedlar's Miss Doran was found to have inaccurate compasses. Later, it was noted that only two teams had qualified (El Encanto and Golden Eagle), with one more likely to qualify (Oklahoma) by the original date of Friday, August 12. On August 12, four crews had passed: Oklahoma (Griffin/Henley), El Encanto (Goddard/Hawkins), Pabco Pacific Flyer (Irving), and Golden Eagle (Frost/Scott). Miss Doran (Pedlar/Knope) passed with a new navigator on August 13. By the qualification deadline of August 15, nine crews had passed the tests; Dallas Spirit was the final qualifier.

On August 10, Hollywood pilot and actor Frank Clarke either withdrew or was disqualified from participating in the race with his navigator, Jeff Warren, in Miss Hollydale, an International F-17 biplane. Clarke announced he would attempt the world endurance record instead and took off abruptly on August 13 with his sponsor, Charley H. Babb, leaving the other contestants fuming. One day later, Clarke sent a telegram to the race sponsors from Los Angeles, apologizing for the furor and officially withdrawing from the race.

On August 15, Frederick Giles was disqualified as he had not arrived in time to meet the navigation qualification test deadline. Giles would go on to attempt a solo flight from San Francisco to Honolulu in November as the first leg of a planned flight to Australia. A missing component on a spare compass for Miss Doran sparked fears of vandalism the night before the flight, and competitors vowed to protect their aircraft with shotguns overnight. Pedlar later stated the missing magnet was probably an oversight by the maintenance crew.

The Air King (formerly City of Peoria), flown by Charles Parkhurst and Ralph C. Lowes Jr., was disqualified at 11:15 AM on the 16th, less than an hour before the first plane would start, because its  tanks were estimated to give the plane a range  short by inspectors.

The Dole Derby

Final participants

The race began on 16 August, by which time the starting line-up had dwindled to nine aircraft, with one of the nine disqualified just before the start of the race. In order of start, they were:
 Oklahoma, one of two modified Travel Air 5000 aircraft, NX911, piloted by Bennett Griffin and navigated by Al Henley
 El Encanto, a Goddard Special metal monoplane, NX5074, flown by Norman A. Goddard and Kenneth C. Hawkins, which was heavily favored in the pre-race odds
 Pabco Pacific Flyer, a Breese-Wilde Monoplane, NX646, flown alone by Livingston Gilson Irving
 Golden Eagle, the prototype Lockheed Vega 1 monoplane, NX913, flown by Jack Frost and navigated by Gordon Scott
 Miss Doran, a Buhl CA-5 Air Sedan, NX2915, flown by Auggy Pedlar, navigated by Vilas R. Knope, and carrying Mildred Doran
 DQ City of Peoria, an Air King biplane, NX3070, flown by Charles Parkhurst and navigated by Ralph Lowes, disqualified the day of the hop-off for inadequate fuel capacity
 Aloha, a Breese-Wilde 5 Monoplane, NX914, flown by Martin Jensen and navigated by Paul Schluter
 Woolaroc, a Travel Air 5000 sister ship of Oklahoma, NX869, flown by Arthur C. Goebel and navigated by William V. Davis
 Dallas Spirit, a Swallow Monoplane, NX941, flown by William Portwood Erwin and navigated by Alvin Eichwaldt

Oakland start

The fifteen competitors were seen off by a crowd estimated to include 75,000 to 100,000 persons on August 16, 1927. A fog bank started at the Golden Gate and the entire route was overcast. At Oakland Municipal Airport, clearance to depart was not granted until just before noon; the fog that had lain over the airport did not lift until 10:40 AM.

The initial takeoffs were plagued with trouble, as several of the heavily-laden aircraft struggled to take off. Oklahoma took off first, just after 12 PM.  The crew would eventually abort the flight over San Francisco with an overheating engine. She was followed by El Encanto at 12:02 PM, which failed to clear the runway before she swerved and crashed, smashing the port wing  from the starting line. Their crews were not hurt. 

The last five planes successfully departed. Golden Eagle took off smoothly at 12:30 PM and flew out of sight. Miss Doran succeeded in taking off at 12:31 PM. The final three, Aloha (at 12:33 PM), Woolaroc (12:34 PM), and Dallas Spirit (12:36 PM) all left uneventfully.

Oklahoma passed through the Golden Gate at 12:20 PM, followed by Aloha at 12:48. Aircraft then began to return: Miss Doran circled back and landed approximately ten minutes after departing (12:43 PM), its engine "sputtering like a Tin Lizzie."  Oklahoma returned to Oakland and Dallas Spirit also turned back, both returning at approximately 1:08 PM; Oklahoma had ripped the fabric covering the fuselage, and Dallas Spirit was having issues with its tail gear.  

Miss Doran and Pabco Flyer would make second starting attempts; Pabco Flyer crashed a second time at 1 PM, putting her out of the race for good, but Miss Doran succeeded and took off again at 2:03 PM.  Of the fifteen teams that participated in the draw, just four were on the course: Golden Eagle, Aloha, Woolaroc, and Miss Doran.

A series of ships were strung out along the route from San Francisco to Honolulu to transmit radio signals (allowing radio-equipped airplanes to take bearings), mark distances, and provide emergency aid if needed. In addition, the Navy's sole aircraft carrier, was put on standby in San Diego.

Woolaroc and Aloha finish
The navigator, Davis, used sextants and smoke bombs to calculate course and wind drift; although the radio beams from the picket ships stationed along the route helped guide the aircraft, Davis used it only to check the course plotted via traditional instruments. Of the four aircraft headed to Hawaii, only Woolaroc had a two-way radio capable of sending and receiving messages. In fact, Davis had packed a spare radio and repair parts based on Bronte's prior experience in July. The crew radioed Wahiawa Radio Station, next to Wheeler Field, when they were approximately  out with an estimated remaining time of 2 hours. They were greeted in Hawaii by a crowd estimated between 25,000 and 30,000, and escorted by a Boeing PW-9 out of Wheeler Field. Goebel and Davis won the race in 26 hours, 17 minutes, earning them the US$25,000 first prize. After their sponsors were paid, Goebel and Davis split the remainder, earning them each US$7,500.

Marguerite Jensen, the wife of Martin, anxiously asked the crew of Woolaroc if they had sighted Aloha, which had departed just ahead of Woolaroc; they replied they had not, adding to her anxiety.

The next morning, at 9:30 AM (Hawaii time) on August 17, Jensen calculated they should be close to Hawaii, based on average speed and time elapsed. Over the next two and a half hours Schluter, the navigator, attempted to determine their position from the sun. When they landed at approximately 2:15 PM, Aloha had only  of fuel remaining; in order to ensure the engine never starved for fuel, the crew was required to pump the gravity-fed tank until it overflowed. 

Aloha arrived approximately two hours after Woolaroc, in 28 hours, 16 minutes, earning Jensen and Schluter the US$10,000 second prize. Out of his $10,000 winnings, pilot Jensen gave his navigator Schluter only $25. Details of Schluter's scanty share became public after he approached friends in Hawaii to help him cash a check; Jensen stated that Schluter had taken the position for experience and the San Francisco Chronicle reported that Schluter had offered to pay any Dole pilot $500 to permit him to navigate. Wyatt singled out the crew of Aloha for praise, calling their use of dead reckoning the greatest single achievement in the history of aviation, especially in comparison to the radio-following course of Woolaroc, which he called "as easy as walking down a railroad track."

Denouement

Search for Golden Eagle and Miss Doran

Neither Golden Eagle nor Miss Doran was ever seen again.  Dole put up a US$10,000 reward for anyone who found either plane; this was matched by each plane's sponsors, for a total of US$20,000 reward for each aircraft.  Of the two, Golden Eagle had a radio capable of reception only and could use the shipboard radio signals for navigation; Miss Doran had no radio equipment at all. The odds of survival were grim; although each plane was required to carry fresh water, food, and a life raft, these were limited in quantity and durability as seaborne assistance had been anticipated to respond quickly. In addition, the route was experiencing rough seas and a high sea state. Unlike the unsuccessful flight of Rodgers in 1925, the two missing aircraft were not flying boats, and they were not expected to remain afloat for more than a few days. Both Jensen and Goebel took to the air and searched the ocean on August 18; Goebel searched near Kauai and Jensen checked the Molokai Channel.

According to Wyatt, the radial engine of Miss Doran was misfiring on four of nine cylinders when it returned to Oakland; he believed the aircraft had gone down shortly after entering the fog bank just off the Golden Gate. Miss Doran was last sighted passing the Farallon Islands at 2:43 PM Pacific Standard Time (PST).

At about the same time,  relayed a message that Woolaroc, possibly accompanied by Miss Doran, was also approximately halfway, at the northern edge of the course. Because Golden Eagle had sufficient fuel to reach and pass Hawaii altogether, some theorized the aircraft may have overshot the goal in the darkness; Wyatt rejected that theory as ludicrous, as the Golden Eagle would have passed over the islands in broad daylight.

42 Navy ships were involved in the search for the Golden Eagle and Miss Doran, joined by smaller vessels based in Hawaii;  and  departed from San Diego the night of August 17. Other surface ships that had set out from California were commanded to shift their search parallel to the Great Circle route.

Some residents of Wailuku stated they had heard an airplane's engine grow louder, then abruptly cease on the afternoon of the 17th. A report that Miss Doran had been found in Honolua Bay the night of August 18 proved to be false; a sampan with an identical red, white, and blue color scheme had been mistaken for the aircraft. On August 19, an amateur radio operator in Alhambra reportedly intercepted a radio message stating a derelict airplane had been found along with a raft containing a live man and a dead woman; the radio frequency was not traditionally used by ships, however, and no ships were known to be in the vicinity of the transmission's origin.

Final flight of Dallas Spirit

After repairing Dallas Spirit, Erwin and Eichwaldt joined the search, leaving Oakland for Honolulu on August 19 at approximately 2:20 PM PST;  the crew intended for Honolulu to be the next stop on their way to Hong Kong to win the Easterwood prize, although Erwin stated they would refuel in Hawaii and fly back to Oakland if they did not spot the missing aircraft on the westbound trip. Local ham radio operators convinced Erwin to take along the radio set from Pabco Pacific Flyer, a 50-watt transmitter powerful enough to allow the aircraft to stay in contact with other operators in California or Hawaii for the entire trip.

Their last radio message, received at 9 PM that night, was that they were in a tailspin approximately  out to sea. Dallas Spirit was also never seen again. Erwin's aircraft was reported to be  from Hawaii at noon on August 20, but the report was not confirmed. Hazelwood scoured a area of  without finding any wreckage or flotsam from Dallas Spirit.

By August 22, naval ships from California had met their counterparts who had left from Hawaii, with neither fleet finding a trace of the three planes. On August 23, green flares were spotted on the slope of Mauna Kea, but Army airplanes sent to investigate reported the flares were a new gasoline-powered light being tested by a rancher.

At the time, the Navy's search operation was authorized to continue until August 23, then extended to August 25, after 16 ships were added to the search fleet, including . Ships were ordered to "Seek Till All Hope Gone" on the night of August 24. The estimated cost of the extra fuel used in the search was US$90,000, later revised to $135,000, with 8,000 sailors involved.

After a thorough search,  radioed that no trace of the missing aircraft had been found.

Fragments and clues
Bright yellow debris with dangling wires was spotted several hundred miles off Cape Flattery on September 1, 1927, thought to be part of Golden Eagle. A silver-colored piece of an aileron washed ashore at Redondo Beach in late October 1927; it may have come from Dallas Spirit, based on the color.

Two fishermen retrieved the collar of a kapok life jacket on September 9 near Waimanalo Beach on Makapuu Point; they stated they had seen the torso of a body in the jacket when they snagged it, but the collar broke free during retrieval. In November 1927, a skeletal leg and foot washed ashore at Eureka, California; it was never conclusively tied to the Dole flyers. 

A note in a bottle was found near Fleming Point on October 5, 1927 and initially thought to be from Mildred Doran; its authenticity was doubted immediately, as the handwriting was noted to be "that of a woman, small and delicate, but ungrammatically worded". A nearly illegible message was found in a perfume bottle washed ashore near Aberdeen, Washington in August 1928; it purported to be from Mildred Doran and was dated October 2, 1927. Another message in a bottle, purportedly from the crew of Golden Eagle, was turned into Redondo Beach police in August 1928; this was also suspected to be a hoax.

The reward for the return of the aircraft was not withdrawn by James Dole until March 1928.

Martin Jensen piloted Aloha on an aerial search, carrying Denham Scott, Golden Eagle navigator Gordon's brother, in May 1928, looking over the jungle slopes of Mauna Kea on the island of Hawaii based on unsubstantiated reports that a monoplane had been spotted there heading for Honolulu on August 17, 1927. Denham also led a ground search. In June 1928, Denham announced that he had found an area where an airplane may have made a forced landing. The tops of the trees had been broken off and a burned rag on a stick was placed at the end at the site. He led a second search on Mauna Loa starting in early August; however, no further clues were found and the search was abandoned later that month.

In April 1929, the wreckage of an unidentified aircraft washed ashore near Carmel. Wreckage from one or more airplanes washed ashore at Kamilo Beach in June 1929; one bit apparently was part of a stabilizer, a  piece of aluminum with a few chips of red, white, and blue paint, matching the livery of Miss Doran. The final search for the missing aviators concluded later that month, as Jack Frost's brother Ezra followed up a theory the Golden Eagle may have crash landed on Mauna Loa.

Aftermath

In the days after the race, the disqualified owners of the Air King charged that race officials should have disqualified the Golden Eagle, because it also had only 350 gallons of fuel capacity when it took off. In a bitter conclusion, the father of the sponsor of the race, Rev. Charles F. Dole, died on November 27, 1927.

Goebel and Davis returned on the Matson liner , with Woolaroc on board, to an impromptu parade in San Francisco, arriving on August 31. They doubted there would be any survivors of a sea ditching. For their winning flight, both Goebel (a Lieutenant in the Army Reserves) and Davis (active-duty Navy) were awarded the Distinguished Flying Cross in 1928.

Jensen returned to San Pedro aboard City of Los Angeles on September 1 and immediately announced he would undertake a non-stop solo flight from Los Angeles to New York, carrying a lion. The lion, named Leo, was one of the Metro-Goldwyn-Mayer studio mascots; they took off on September 16 after the lion had raw steaks. However, the aircraft never arrived in New York; Jensen crash-landed on an Arizona mountain in heavy fog.

Woolaroc has survived and is on display at the Woolaroc Museum in Oklahoma, which started as a hangar to store and display the plane. Aloha was sold to a New York businessman and destroyed in a 1933 hangar fire at Roosevelt Field. Both Woolaroc and Aloha were powered by the Wright Whirlwind, which added to that engine's endurance legend, as it had already been used in Spirit of St. Louis (Lindbergh), Columbia (Chamberlin/Levine), America (Byrd), Bird of Paradise (Maitland/Hegenberger), and City of Oakland (Smith/Bronte).

Both Ernie Smith, pilot of the first civilian nonstop flight to Hawaii, and Ben Wyatt, navigation examiner for the Dole Air Race, criticized the race after its conclusion. Smith called it "stunt flying – not practical with land planes. And now there are six men and a girl out there somewhere battling for their lives. All for $35,000. It isn't worth it." Wyatt believed that "[no] scientific value can be derived from such flights [with land planes]." Goebel, Davis, and Jensen proposed that all aircraft flying over large bodies of water should be required to carry radio equipment.

Planning for a memorial service at sea occurred in late August and early September. A separate service was held by the San Francisco Women's Club on September 8. Tributes and flowers were loaded onto  at the Matson Lines dock on Piers 30 and 32 in San Francisco before it departed for its regular service to Honolulu. On September 16, Maui stopped at the spot where the last message was received from the Dallas Spirit to spread the flowers and release a floral Bible made by Miss Doran's students. Each of the seven flyers who died was eulogized and Tennyson's poem "Crossing the Bar" was recited.

Constance Ohl Erwin, the wife of Bill, pilot of Dallas Spirit, gave birth to a son on October 12, 1927 and named him Bill.

Davis, navigator of Woolaroc, stated "We know now that flying is a practical means of transportation across the Pacific. All that is necessary is a popular demand for this speedy transportation." Just under one year later, Charles Kingsford Smith and the crew of the Fokker F.VII trimotor Southern Cross successfully flew a trans-Pacific route from Oakland to Australia via Hawaii and Fiji; Smith was carrying Alvin Eichwaldt's ring. The United States Navy set a record for flight time in a successful mass flight from California to Hawaii concluded in January 1934; later that year, Kingsford Smith became the first to fly east from Hawaii to California in November when he retraced his 1928 flight in reverse using Lady Southern Cross, setting a new speed record in the process. In January 1935 Amelia Earhart completed the first solo flight from Hawaii to California. Pan American established a trans-Pacific route later that year during a series of flights, and began regular commercial "Clipper" flying boat service from San Francisco to Manila via Hawaii, Midway, Wake, and Guam in October 1936.

Race summary

See also

 List of aviation awards

References

Further reading

 
 
 
 
 
 
 Forden, Leslie N. (1975). "The Dole Race". Journal of the American Aviation Historical Society.
 
 
 
 
 
 Burlingame, Burl (1986, 2003–04). "The Dole Derby". Honolulu Star-Bulletin

External links
Dole Air Race at Flickr Commons via San Diego Air and Space Museum
 Movie reel of the Dole Air Race 
This day in Aviation, extensive account and pictures from Dole Air Race
 
Martin Jensen Papers at the University of Wyoming - American Heritage Center

Air races
Aviation accidents and incidents in 1927
Aviation awards
Challenge awards
Dole plc
Aerial disappearances
Aviation accidents and incidents in Hawaii
History of the Pacific Ocean
History of Honolulu
History of Oakland, California
1927 in aviation
1927 in California
1927 in Hawaii